Indoor hockey at the Southeast Asian Games was first introduced at the 2017 Southeast Asian Games in Kuala Lumpur, Malaysia.

Malaysia won the first men's tournament and Thailand the first women's tournament. In the most recent edition Malaysia won both tournaments.

Men's tournament

Results

Summary

* = hosts

Team appearances

Women's tournament

Results

Summary

* = hosts

Team appearances

Medal table

Total

Men

Women

References

 
Sports at the Southeast Asian Games
Southeast Asian Games
Southeast Asian Games